The following is a list of National Collegiate Athletic Association (NCAA) Division II college ice hockey teams that have qualified for the NCAA Division II Men's Ice Hockey Championship as of 1999 with teams listed by number of appearances.

References

Appearances By Team